Stanley Roberts (1916–1982) was an American screenwriter.

He was nominated for an Academy Award for the film The Caine Mutiny in the category of Best Adapted Screenplay.

Partial filmography
 Young Dynamite (1937)

References

External links

1916 births
1982 deaths
American male screenwriters
20th-century American male writers
20th-century American screenwriters